Mitchell House may refer to:

Australia
 Mitchell House (Melbourne, Victoria)

United States
by state then city
Drewry-Mitchell-Moorer House, Eufaula, Alabama, NRHP-listed in Barbour County
Bragg-Mitchell House, Mobile, Alabama, NRHP-listed in Mobile County
 Mitchell House (Batesville, Arkansas), listed on the National Register of Historic Places (NRHP) in Independence County
 Mitchell House (Gentry, Arkansas), listed on the NRHP in Benton County
Mitchell-Ward House (Gentry, Arkansas), NRHP-listed in Benton County
 Mitchell House (Little Rock, Arkansas), listed on the NRHP in Pulaski County
Beisel-Mitchell House, Paragould, Arkansas, NRHP-listed
 Mitchell House (Waltreak, Arkansas), listed on the NRHP in Yell County
Guerry-Mitchell House, Americus, Georgia, NRHP-listed in Sumter County
Burch-Mitchell House, Thomasville, Georgia, NRHP-listed in Thomas County
Joseph Mitchell House, Smithville, Indiana, NRHP-listed
Lanphear-Mitchell House, Atchison, Kansas, NRHP-listed in Atchison County
Glen Mitchell House, Dodge City, Kansas, also known as Mitchell House
James P. Mitchell House and Farmstead, Mitchellsburg, Kentucky, NRHP-listed in Boyle County
Mitchell-Estes Farmstead, Smiths Grove, Kentucky, NRHP-listed in Warren and Edmonson counties
 Mitchell House (Yarmouth, Maine), listed on the NRHP in Maine
 Mitchell House (Elkton, Maryland), listed on the NRHP in Cecil County
 Mitchell House (Fair Hill, Maryland), listed on the NRHP in Cecil County
Amy B. Mitchell House, Winchester, Massachusetts, NRHP-listed
Charles T. Mitchell House, Cadillac, Michigan, NRHP-listed
Mitchell-Tappan House, Hibbing, Minnesota, NRHP-listed in St. Louis County
Davis-Mitchell House, Vicksburg, Mississippi, NRHP-listed in Warren County
William Mitchell House, Ahoskie, North Carolina, NRHP-listed
 Mitchell House (Thomasville, North Carolina), listed on the NRHP in Davidson County
Charles Mitchell House, Washington Township, Ohio, NRHP-listed in Franklin County
Randolph Mitchell House, New Reading, Ohio, NRHP-listed
Richard H. Mitchell House, Cincinnati, Ohio, NRHP-listed
Mitchell Hall (Eastern Oklahoma State College), Wilburton, Oklahoma, NRHP-listed in Latimer County
Hargis-Mitchell-Cochran House, Wynnewood, Oklahoma, NRHP-listed in Garvin County
Mitchell-Shook House, Greencastle, Pennsylvania, NRHP-listed
James Mitchell House, Indiana, Pennsylvania, NRHP-listed
Mitchell-Arnold House, Pawtucket, Rhode Island, NRHP-listed
Mitchell-Ward House (Belvidere, North Carolina), NRHP-listed
Crowell Mitchell House, Leesville, South Carolina, NRHP-listed
Gen. William Mitchell House, Middleburg, Virginia, NRHP-listed
Mitchell-Shealy House, Leesville, South Carolina, NRHP-listed
McKendree Mitchell House, Batesburg, South Carolina, NRHP-listed
 Mitchell House (Lebanon, Tennessee), listed on the NRHP in Wilson County
Guy Mitchell House, Victoria, Texas, NRHP-listed in Victoria County
Byron T. Mitchell House, Francis, Utah, NRHP-listed in Summit County
Alexander Mitchell House (Salt Lake City, Utah), NRHP-listed
King-Lancaster-McCoy-Mitchell House, Bristol, Virginia, NRHP-listed
Mitchell-Rountree House, Platteville, Wisconsin, NRHP-listed in Grant County

See also
Mitchell Hall (disambiguation)
Mitchell-Ward House (disambiguation)